George W. Andree (February 7, 1879 – October 5, 1934) was an American college football coach for Georgia Tech in 1902.

Andree was born in Manistee, Michigan, but grew up in Scottville, Michigan where his parents owned the town's first hotel. He was deaf and attended Gallaudet College (now Gallaudet University), a college established for students with hearing and speaking disabilities. He graduated from the school in 1902. He was considered a star athlete for Gallaudet and played four years as halfback on the football team and as catcher for three years on the baseball team. He was captain of the Gallaudet baseball team in both 1900 and 1901. The 1901 football team had Gilbert O. Erickson and Andree in the backfield.

After graduation, Andree became coach of the 1902 Georgia Tech football team. He was known as an expert lipreader and taught the players how to use non-verbal signals to confuse the opposing teams. However, the 1902 season was not very successful and Georgia Tech had no wins and just two ties out of eight contests. It was Andree's only year coaching the team.

In 1908, following his coaching career, Andree earned a Doctor of Dental Surgery (DDS) degree from the University of Michigan School of Dentistry and later practiced in Tishomingo, Oklahoma. He became president of the Oklahoma Dentist Association and a legislative committee member of the National Dentists' Association shortly before his death. He died on October 5, 1934, in Scottville, Michigan after a prolonged illness.

Head coaching record

References

1879 births
1934 deaths
19th-century players of American football
American dentists
American football halfbacks
Baseball catchers
Gallaudet Bison baseball players
Gallaudet Bison football players
Georgia Tech Yellow Jackets football coaches
University of Michigan School of Dentistry alumni
People from Manistee, Michigan
People from Mason County, Michigan
People from Tishomingo, Oklahoma
Players of American football from Michigan
Baseball players from Michigan
American deaf people
American disabled sportspeople